The South Australian Tertiary Admissions Centre (SATAC) processes applications for entry into courses offered at participating educational institutions in South Australia and the Northern Territory.

Participating institutions
 TAFE SA (Technical and Further Education)
 Charles Darwin University
 Flinders University
 The University of Adelaide
 University of South Australia (UniSA)
 CQUniversity Australia
 International College of Hotel Management (ICHM)
 South Australian Institute of Business and Technology (SAIBT)
 Tabor (Australia)
 Torrens University Australia

References

External links
 South Australian Tertiary Admissions Centre
 Australian Council for Educational Research

Education in South Australia
University and college admissions
Australian tertiary education admission agencies